is a helicopter simulation developed by Syscom Entertainment, and published by Take-Two Interactive for the PlayStation 2. The players role in the game is a rescue helicopter pilot. The object of the game is to save civilians from fires that spring up around the city. The player must also put out the fires using water that is dumped from the helicopter. Each mission has a time limit, but the faster the player saves people and puts out fires, the more time they receive to complete the next part of the mission. The game also features missions where a criminal is driving around the city, and the player must use their searchlight to help the police locate and stop them.

Reception

The game received "mixed" reviews according to the review aggregation website Metacritic. Scott Steinberg of NextGen called it "A flight sim for gamers possessed of big hearts and razor-sharp hand-eye coordination." In Japan, Famitsu gave it a score of 30 out of 40.

References

External links

2001 video games
Flight simulation video games
Helicopter video games
PlayStation 2 games
PlayStation 2-only games
Take-Two Interactive games
Video games about firefighting
Video games developed in Japan
RenderWare games